Hot Hits 6 is an album of anonymous cover-versions that reached number 1 in the UK. From 7 August 1971 to 8 January 1972, budget albums were included in the main album charts, allowing this to chart.

Track listing
From Discogs.
Zoo Dee Zoo Zong
River Deep Mountain High
Banner Man
Me and You and a Dog Named Boo
When You Are a King
Pied Piper
Chirpy Chirpy Cheep Cheep
Tom-Tom Turnaround
Don't Let It Die
Black and White
Monkey Spanner
Co-co

References

1971 compilation albums